Fakhrabad (also Romanized as Fakhrābād) is a village in Aqda Rural District, Aqda District, Ardakan County, Yazd Province, Iran. At the 2006 census, its population was 187, in 56 families.

References 

Populated places in Ardakan County